Skeletal fluorosis is a bone disease caused by excessive accumulation of fluoride leading to weakened bones. In advanced cases, skeletal fluorosis causes painful damage to bones and joints.

Symptoms
Symptoms are mainly promoted in the bone structure. Due to a high fluoride concentration in the body, the bone is hardened and thus less elastic, resulting in an increased frequency of fractures. Other symptoms include thickening of the bone structure and accumulation of bone tissue, which both contribute to impaired joint mobility. Ligaments and cartilage can become ossified. Most patients with skeletal fluorosis show side effects from the high fluoride dose such as ruptures of the stomach lining and nausea.
Fluoride can also damage the parathyroid glands, leading to hyperparathyroidism, the uncontrolled secretion of parathyroid hormones. These hormones regulate calcium concentration in the body. An elevated parathyroid hormone concentration results in a depletion of calcium in bone structures and thus a higher calcium concentration in the blood. As a result, bone flexibility decreases making the bone more susceptible to fractures.

Causes
Common causes of fluorosis include inhalation of fluoride dusts or fumes by workers in industry and consumption of fluoride from drinking water (levels of fluoride in excess of levels that are considered safe.)

In India, especially the Nalgonda region (Telangana), a common cause of fluorosis is fluoride-rich drinking water that is sourced from deep-bore wells. Over half of groundwater sources in India have fluoride above recommended levels.

Fluorosis can also occur as a result of volcanic activity. The 1783 eruption of the Laki volcano in Iceland is estimated to have killed about 22% of the Icelandic population, and 60% of livestock, as a result of fluorosis and sulfur dioxide gases.  The 1693 eruption of Hekla also led to fatalities of livestock under similar conditions.

Skeletal fluorosis phases

Treatment
As of now, there are no established treatments for skeletal fluorosis patients. However, it is reversible in some cases, depending on the progression of the disease. If fluorine intake is stopped, the amount in bone will decrease and be excreted via urine.  However, it is a very slow process to eliminate the fluorine from the body completely. Minimal results are seen in patients.
Treatment of side effects is also very difficult. For example, a patient with a bone fracture cannot be treated according to standard procedures, because the bone is very brittle. In this case, recovery will take a very long time and a pristine healing cannot be guaranteed. However, further fluorosis can be prevented by drinking defluoridated water. It is recently suggested that drinking of defluoridated water from the "calcium amended-hydroxyapatite" defluoridation method may help in the fluorosis reversal.  Defluoridated water from this suggested method provides calcium-enriched alkaline drinking water as generally fluoride contaminated water has a low amount of calcium mineral and drinking alkaline water helps in eliminating the toxic fluoride from the body.

Epidemiology
In some areas, skeletal fluorosis is endemic.  While fluorosis is most severe and widespread in the world's two most populous countries – India and China – UNICEF estimates that "fluorosis is endemic in at least 25 countries across the globe. The total number of people affected is not known, but a conservative estimate would number in the tens of millions."

In India, 20 states have been identified as endemic areas, with an estimated 60 million people at risk and 6 million people disabled; about 600,000 might develop a neurological disorder as a consequence.

Effects on animals

The histological changes which are induced through fluorine on rats resemble those of humans.

See also
 Dental fluorosis
 Fluoride poisoning
 Kaj Roholm

References

Further reading
 Fluorosis from drinking very large amounts of tea:

External links 

Osteopathies
Fluorine
Health disasters in India